Anthidium eremicum is a species of bee in the family Megachilidae, the leaf-cutter, carder, or mason bees.

Synonyms
Synonyms for this species include:
Anthidium aleppense Mavromoustakis, 1954

References

eremicum
Insects described in 1938